Old Town is a neighborhood and historic district in Near North Side and Lincoln Park, Chicago, Illinois, home to many of Chicago's older, Victorian-era buildings, including St. Michael's Church, one of seven buildings to survive the Great Chicago Fire.

Location and name of Old Town

In the 19th century, German immigrants moved to the meadows north of North Avenue and began farming what had previously been swampland, planting celery, potatoes, and cabbages. This led the area to be nicknamed "The Cabbage Patch", a name which stuck until the early 1900s.

During World War II, the triangle formed by North Avenue, Clark Street, and Ogden Avenue (since removed) were designated a 'neighborhood defense unit' by Chicago's Civil Defense Agency. In the years immediately after the war, the population of "North Town" (as it had come to be known by the 1940s) sponsored annual art fairs called the "Old Town Holiday". The art fairs were popular attractions for the neighborhood, and the name "Old Town" was used in the title of the Old Town Triangle Association when it was formed in 1948, by residents who wanted to improve the condition of buildings that were suffering from physical deterioration.

In the 1950s, much of Old Town was an enclave for many of the first Puerto Ricans to emigrate to Chicago. They referred to this area as part of "La Clark".

No legal entity is known as "Old Town", but claims have been made as to the nature of its legally unspecified borders:

History of Old Town

Early history

The land known as Old Town originally served as a home and trade center to many Native American Nations including Potawatomi, Miami, and Illinois.

Following the 1833 Treaty of Chicago, most of the indigenous people were forcibly removed, and the land was then settled in the 1850s by German-Catholic immigrants. Clark Street is a leftover of the culture, being an old road which followed a slight ridge along Lake Michigan.

Old Town is the site of many of Chicago's older, Victorian-era buildings, as well as St. Michael's Church, originally a Bavarian-built church and one of seven to survive within the boundaries of the Great Chicago Fire.

Many of the streets and alleys, particularly in the Old Town Triangle section, predate the Great Chicago Fire and do not all adhere to a typical Chicago grid pattern.

Old Town has one Brown-Purple Line 'El' station, at 1536–40 North Sedgwick Street. It is one of the oldest standing stations on the El, built in 1900.

In 1924, the first gay-rights organization in American history, the Society for Human Rights, was established by Henry Gerber at his home, the Henry Gerber House, on North Crilly Court. The Henry Gerber House was designated a Chicago Landmark on June 6, 2001. In June 2015, it was named a National Historic Landmark.

In 1927, sculptors Sol Kogen and Edgar Miller purchased and subsequently rehabilitated a house on Burton Place, near Wells Street, into the Carl Street Studios. During the 1930s, an art colony emerged in the neighborhood as artists moved from the Towertown neighborhood near Washington Square Park.

1950s–1969

In 1955, upon the first election of Mayor Daley, 43rd ward alderman Paddy Bauler, who kept a saloon in Old Town at North and Sedgwick Avenues called De Luxe Gardens, famously declared "Chicago ain't ready for reform yet" many times over in his bar while dancing a jig.

During the 1960s, the neighborhood was the center of the yippie and hippie counter culture in the midwestern United States. This was mostly because by the 1950s and 1960s, many of the original families that had settled in the neighborhood had moved to the suburbs during white flight, leaving older Victorian buildings with storefronts available to rent inexpensively. A community of Puerto Ricans formed along Wieland, North Park, Sedgwick and west on North Avenue. The Young Lords, then a street gang with Jose Cha-Cha Jimenez had a branch of their group at Wieland and North Avenues. This dense storefront-laden area (Wells and North Avenues) became also the nexus of hippie culture, (as well as the newly emerging out-homosexual culture) and gave rise to the boutiques (Crate & Barrel, for example) in the neighborhood today. Seed was a literary staple of the neighborhood at the time.

The violent events that took place during the 1968 Democratic National Convention transpired primarily in Grant Park, Old Town, and Lincoln Park, adjacent to Old Town.

The film The Weather Underground has a scene on La Salle Avenue in Old Town, which describes the Zeitgeist of the era.

Old Town was home to many gays and lesbians from the 1960s through the 1980s. There were numerous gay bars lining Wells Street (all of them closed as of 2013). This was the first "gay ghetto" in Chicago, predating the current Lake View neighborhood (which is the current epicenter of gay life); As the area gentrified, gay residents moved further north to Lincoln Park and then Lake View neighborhoods.

During the 1960s and 1970s, Old Town became the center of Chicago folk music, which was experiencing a revival at the time. In 1957, the Old Town School of Folk Music opened at 333 West North Avenue and stayed at that address until 1968, when the school moved to 909 West Armitage Avenue. It has retained the name, although it is no longer located within Old Town. Singer-songwriters such as Bob Gibson, Steve Goodman, Bonnie Koloc, and John Prine played at several clubs on Wells Street, such as The Earl of Old Town. The Old Town School of Folk Music was closely associated with these artists and clubs. One large and successful folk club was Mother Blues, which featured nationally known artists and groups such as Jose Feliciano, Odetta, Oscar Brown Jr., Josh White, and Chad Mitchell. It also presented comedian George Carlin, Sergio Mendez, Brazil '66, and The Jefferson Airplane.

A few of the institutions from the 1960s era still exist today, such as The Second City, the Old Town Ale House, Bijou Video, the Old Town School of Folk Music (which moved after the 1968 riots), the Fudge Pot, the Up Down Tobacco Shop (which used to be located just south of its current location), and the Old Town Aquarium (which moved in 2019 to Irving Park, while keeping its name).

1970s until today

After the assassination of Martin Luther King Jr. and the subsequent riots, the neighborhood experienced a tense racial division during the 1970s and 1980s which left a segregation between Old Town north of North Ave. and Old Town south of North Ave. In the early 2000s, this trend had begun to shift towards a gentrification of the area south of North Ave. on Sedgwick, Blackhawk, Hudson and Mohawk streets, near the Marshall Field Garden Apartments. The area to the west of these streets, near the North and Clybourn Red Line stop had been dubbed "SoNo" by real estate developers. SoNo's boundaries are North Avenue, Halsted Street, Division Street and the North Branch of the Chicago River. Currently, Old Town south of North Avenue is a mixture of wealth and poverty, though the area is steadily gentrifying. The demolition of the Cabrini–Green high rise housing projects to the south has led to significant demographic changes in the neighborhood. The original Francis X. Cabrini Row Houses still are standing. The Parkside of Old Town development was built replacing the Cabrini-Green high rises just south of Old Town.

By 1976, Wells Street in Old Town had many sex-industry businesses operating, so many that Wells street was specifically named in Time Magazine's 1976 article "The Porno Plague". It was thought that some of the businesses had mob connections.

Current cultural amenities in the neighborhood include Old Town Triangle Art Center, and the annual Old Town Art Fair. Noble Horse Theater stood from 1871 until a 2015 arson forced a sale in 2017, and the land was bought and built into condominiums.

Education
Chicago Public Schools (CPS) operates public schools for the area.

Manierre K–8 School is in "Sedville", a gang territory area in Old Town. , it was considered a low-performing school. In the 2010s, CPS considered merging Jenner K–8 in Cabrini-Green and Manierre together, but concerns involving students crossing gang territorial lines meant that both schools remained open.

See also
 German immigration
 National Register of Historic Places listings in North Side Chicago

References

External links

 Old Town Triangle Association
 Manierre Elementary School and Ferguson Parent-Child Center – Neighborhood school for Old Town
 Photos of Old Town
 Chicago Traveler
 Old Town Merchants and Residents Association
 City Of Chicago landmark of Old Town
  – article about Old Town and gentrification
 Grand Valley State University special collections

Neighborhoods in Chicago
North Side, Chicago
Historic districts in Chicago
Populated places established in 1872
1872 establishments in Illinois
Historic districts on the National Register of Historic Places in Illinois
National Register of Historic Places in Chicago
Articles containing video clips
Chicago Landmarks